The 1986–87 FIS Ski Jumping World Cup was the eighth World Cup season in ski jumping. It began in Thunder Bay, Canada on 6 December 1986 and finished in Oslo, Norway on 21 March 1987. The individual World Cup was won by Vegard Opaas and Nations Cup by Austria.

Map of world cup hosts 
All 16 locations which have been hosting world cup events for men this season. Event in Oberhof was completely canceled.

 Four Hills Tournament
 KOP International Ski Flying Week

Calendar

Men

Standings

Overall

Nations Cup

Four Hills Tournament

References 

World cup
World cup
FIS Ski Jumping World Cup